Finn Skårderud (born 27 October 1956) is a Norwegian psychiatrist, psychotherapist, author and professor.

Career 
He leads The Psychotherapy Project at Oslo University Hospital, runs a private practice and is the psychiatrist for The Norwegian Olympic Committee, working with elite athletes. He is professor at Department of Special Needs Education at University of Oslo and at Lillehammer University College. He is also an author and film, art and literature critic, and has produced numerous scientific papers, books and book chapters within the fields psychiatry, psychology, culture, literature and film, both fiction and non-fiction.

In popular culture
Skårderud's unconventional suggestion that when humans are born they have a blood alcohol level 0.05% too low forms the central premise of 2020 Danish comedy drama film Another Round. This is not a real theory, but a misinterpreted preface written by Skårderud to a book first published in 1881, 'On the psychological effects of wine' by Edmondo de Amicis.

References

Academic staff of Lillehammer University College
1956 births
Living people
Norwegian psychiatrists
Norwegian psychology writers